Jean-Marie Vianney Rudasingwa (31 December 1960 – 8 April 1994) was a Rwandan Olympic middle-distance runner. He represented his country in the men's 1500 meters and the men's 800 meters at the 1984 Summer Olympics. His time was a 3:57.62 in the 1500, and a 1:53.23 in the 800 heats.

References 

1960 births
1994 deaths
Rwandan male middle-distance runners
Olympic athletes of Rwanda
Athletes (track and field) at the 1984 Summer Olympics
People from Gisenyi